The word Mediolanum has been used to name three distinct international express trains that have run to and from Milano Centrale in Milan, Italy since 1957.  The focus of these trains on the city now known as Milan reflects the fact that Mediolanum is the Latin word for ancient Milan.

History
The first Mediolanum was a first-class-only Trans Europ Express (TEE).  It linked München Hbf in Munich, Germany, with Milano Centrale, via the Brenner railway.  Introduced in 1957, it was operated by the Deutsche Bundesbahn (DB), the Austrian Federal Railways (ÖBB) and the Italian State Railways (FS).

On 3 June 1984, the train was downgraded from a TEE to a two-class InterCity, but was extended north from Munich to Dortmund (Hbf), in place of an IC train previously named Nymphenburg, on the same schedule as the latter had used. Now operating between Dortmund and Milan via Munich and the Brenner line, this second Mediolanum was operated by the same three operators, but only until 1987, when it was replaced by the EuroCity Leonardo da Vinci, running on the same route and schedule.

In 2001, Mediolanum was revived as the name of an InterCity, this time for train IC 253/254 between Basel SBB in Basel, Switzerland, and Milano Centrale.  The third Mediolanum was operated by the Swiss Federal Railways (SBB-CFF-FFS) and FS until 2004, when it was reclassified as a EuroCity and its operation transferred to Cisalpino.

Rolling stock

During its time as a TEE, the Mediolanum changed several times from using Italian cars to German ones or vice versa. In 1969, these were replaced by German (DB) diesel multiple units, of class VT 11.5. In 1972, the train returned to using Italian FS cars, but now electric locomotive-hauled instead of multiple-unit trainsets, with different locomotives over different portions of the route. In summer 1977, the train was once again using DB coaches, remaining locomotive-hauled, but in autumn 1979 it returned to using FS coaches. When the TEE Mediolanum was using Italian cars, its restaurant car was operated by Wagons-Lits, and when it was using German cars, the restaurant was operated by the German Sleeper and Dining Car Company (DSG).

See also

 History of rail transport in Austria
 History of rail transport in Germany
 History of rail transport in Italy
 History of rail transport in Switzerland
 List of named passenger trains of Europe

References

Notes

Bibliography

External links

EuroCity
International named passenger trains
Named passenger trains of Austria
Named passenger trains of Germany
Named passenger trains of Italy
Named passenger trains of Switzerland
Trans Europ Express
Railway services introduced in 1957